Achoke Tan Saya Pe was a Burmese poet during the late Konbaung era, famous for his anti-colonial Burmese lyric poems called taydats. His contemporary poet is U Ponnya, and same-name poet is Taungthaman Le-sar Maung Pe Nge.

Life
Saya Pe was born on 23 June 1838 in Inwa. His father was part of the royal household staff during the reign of King Pagan, and later became a tailor sewing saddles for the royal cavalry during the reign of King Mindon. His mother was descended from a line of artisans.

Living in Tailors' Row (Achoke Tan), west of the southern gate (Mingala Gate), present-day Cittaramahi quarters, Saya Pe became known as Achoke Tan Saya Pe.

Pe served as a bearer of Prince of Mekkhaya's insignia during the reign of King Mindon.

After the abdication of King Thibaw, Saya Pe went to the Shan States, and served under the Saopha of Thonze. Pe died on circa 1894 at where he sheltered.

Career
Saya Pe composed many poems, especially taydats (တေးထပ်) and laygyos (လေးချိုး). The renowned ones are:
 Tway Mi Daing
 Shwe Zi-byu Thabaw Thoh 
 Min Tutu Khway Thethe
 Hsaung Yadu Pwe

References

See also
Burmese literature

1838 births
1894 deaths
Burmese male poets
19th-century Burmese poets